Zhou Yuyu (23 April 1911 – 1994) was a Chinese racewalker. He competed in the men's 50 kilometres walk at the 1936 Summer Olympics.

References

External links
 

1911 births
1994 deaths
Athletes (track and field) at the 1936 Summer Olympics
Chinese male racewalkers
Olympic athletes of China
Place of birth missing